Al-Mudhaibi is the largest willaya in Ash Sharqiyah region of Oman. It has two niabas: Sinaw and Samad Ash Shan. Suq Sinaw is one of the most popular suqs in Oman. Dresses, khanjars and jewelry are sold there. It includes villages like Al Sudairah, Barzman, and Al Zahib.

On 25 November 2019, 45 well-preserved tombs covering a 50-80 square metre area and a settlement, dating back to beginning of the Iron Age, has been discovered in Al-Mudhaibi, specifically in Al Saleeli mountain by archaeologists from Oman and Heidelberg University. Archaeologists believed that the site belonged to the miners who were working in copper mining.

References

 
Populated places in Oman
Ash Sharqiyah North Governorate